The 1931 AAA Championship Car season consisted of seven races, beginning in Speedway, Indiana on May 30 and concluding in Syracuse, New York on September 12.  There was also one non-championship race.  The AAA National Champion and Indianapolis 500 winner was Louis Schneider.

Schedule and results
All races running on Dirt/Brick/Board Oval.

Leading National Championship standings

References

See also
 1931 Indianapolis 500

AAA Championship Car season
AAA Championship Car
1931 in American motorsport